Line 4 is a loop line of the Shanghai Metro network. Its older rolling stock carry a bright purple colour belt to differentiate them from Line 3 trains which share a portion of its route, while the newer stock features a yellow and purple livery, which the exact line is labelled using sticker or screens saying “Line 3” or “Line 4”. To determine the direction of travel, the line that travels counter-clockwise is called the Outer Loop, while the other line is known as the Inner Loop. Although it is a loop line, trains returning to the depot use  as a terminal to let all passengers disembark. The remainder of the line opened on December 29, 2007. The line is colored purple on system maps.

History

October 11, 2009 became China's first national "Worker Pioneer" subway line.

Construction accident
On August 20, 2001 on 20.10 at  construction site during excavating the foundation pit, earthmoving sudden landslide, killing four people died who were buried in the landslide.

At 4 o'clock in the morning on July 1, 2003, the Pudongnan Road-Nanpu Bridge section of Line 4 suddenly saw water seepage during the construction of the connecting passage between the upper and lower tunnels. After that, a large amount of quicksand poured into the tunnel, causing internal and external pressure imbalance, which caused partial collapse of the tunnel. It has a funnel-shaped settlement. At 9 o'clock in the morning, the podium of a nearby building on South Zhongshan Road collapsed; beginning in the early morning of the July 2, the flood wall of Dongjiadu Waima Road section began to sink and crack due to the settlement. The embankment collapsed in a serious accident. The Linjiang Garden Building near the scene also experienced subsidence, the most serious settlement exceeded 7 millimeters in an hour, and the cumulative settlement reached 15.6 millimeters. This incident affected the plan for the opening of the entire line of Line 4. In August 2004, the Dongjiadu section restoration project was started and it was restored with the opening of the second section in July 2007.
On November 5, 2004, the Shanghai Second Intermediate People’s Court issued a judgement on the deputy project manager of the subcontractor for the construction of the intermediate air shaft and side channel freezing method. The court convicted him for the crime of a major liability accident which has a fixed-term imprisonment of two years and six months and a probation of three years. The project director representative has a fixed-term imprisonment of six-month with a probation period of two years. The general contractor’s project manager for two years with a fixed-term imprisonment of one year and six months.

At  unbalanced subsidence was discovered. From January 22 to January 28, 2012, it was closed for an overhaul.

Stations

Service routes

Important stations
: Interchange with line 3. To transfer to line 1, passengers need to exit through a tunnel inside Shanghai railway station and purchase a ticket to re-enter the station.
: Interchange with lines 2 and 3.
: Interchange with lines 2, 6 and 9. It is Shanghai's first 4-line interchange station.
: The first platform-to-platform interchange station in the Shanghai Metro network. Interchange with line 8.
: Serves Shanghai Stadium.
: Serves the sports stadium of the same name and the biggest regional and interregional bus station in the city. Interchange with line 1.
: Serves East China Normal University. Interchange with lines 3 and 13.
: Serves Donghua University.

Future extensions
There are abandoned plans to end the shared tracks with line 3. Plans include a new underground track for line 4 on the northwestern past.

Station name change
 On 28 October 2006, Dongfang Road was renamed as the  after station renovation for line 2 and the opening of line 4.

Headways 
<onlyinclude>

Technology

Signaling
Lines 3 and 4 has been operating over capacity due to large passenger flows for a number of years. With the continuous extensions of operating time, the problems of aging equipment and increasing passenger demand will further increase the operating pressure of the two lines. In June 2021 it was announced that Shanghai Metro has started to update of the signal system of lines 3 and 4 and finish before December 31, 2024.
These are the last lines in the system that are equipped with fixed block Alstom URBALISTM 200 system, not equipped with CBTC systems capable of headways as low as 90 seconds. CASCO successfully won the bid for the renewal and transformation of the signaling for lines 3 and 4 using its self-developed Qiji TACS system.

Rolling Stock

Former Rolling Stock

References

Shanghai Metro lines
Railway loop lines
 
Railway lines opened in 2005
2005 establishments in China